THFA may refer to:

 Tetrahydrofolic acid, a folic acid derivative
 Tetrahydrofurfuryl alcohol, a colorless liquid that is used as a specialty solvent and synthetic intermediate